Agha Mirza Muhammad Baqir Chahar Suqi Mosque is related to the Qajar dynasty and is located in Isfahan.

References

Mosques in Iran
Mosque buildings with domes
National works of Iran